The Sony Zeiss Sonnar T* FE 35mm F2.8 ZA is a wide-angle full-frame prime lens for the Sony E-mount. It was announced by Sony on October 13, 2015.

Though designed for Sony's full frame E-mount cameras, the lens can be used on Sony's APS-C E-mount camera bodies, with an equivalent full-frame field-of-view of 52.5mm.

Build quality
The lens itself is made of a thin weather resistant aluminum shell over plastic internals. The lens is also one of the thinnest lenses offered for Sony full-frame cameras.

See also
List of Sony E-mount lenses
Samyang Optics / Rokinon AF 35 mm f/2.8 FE
Zeiss Sonnar

References

Camera lenses introduced in 2013
35
35